Events from the year 1702 in Denmark.

Incumbents
 Monarch – Frederick IV
 Grand Chancellor – Conrad von Reventlow

Events
 21 February  Vornedskab is abolished on Zealand and Lolland-Falster (already abolished on Møn in 1696).
 18 July  Charles Frederick, Duke of Holstein-Gottorp succeeds his father as Duke of Schleswig.

Undated
 Moltke Mansion established
 Vornedskab abolished

Births
 5 January  Peder Luxdorph, judge and landowner (born 1648)
 10 May – Abraham Lehn, landowner (died 1757)
 1 August – Christian Danneskiold-Samsøe, Danish nobleman (died 1728)

Deaths
 17 February – Peder Syv, philologist, folklorist and priest (born 1631)

References

 
Denmark
1700s in Denmark
Years of the 18th century in Denmark